Climate inertia or climate change inertia is the phenomenon by which a planet's climate system shows a resistance or slowness to deviate away from a given dynamic state.  It can accompany stability and other effects of feedback within complex systems, and includes the inertia exhibited by physical movements of matter and exchanges of energy.  The concept is applied somewhat loosely, like it commonly is elsewhere.  Inertia has been associated with the drivers of, and the responses to, climate change.

Increasing fossil-fuel carbon emissions are a primary inertial driver of change to Earth's climate during recent decades, and vary based on the collective socioeconomic inertia of its over 8 billion human inhabitants. Many system components have exhibited inertial responses to this driver, also known as a forcing. The rate of rise in global surface temperature (GST) has especially been resisted by 1) the thermal inertia of the planet's surface, primarily its ocean and cryosphere, and 2) inertial behavior within its carbon cycle feedback.  Energy stored in the ocean following the inertial responses principally determines near-term irreversible change known as climate commitment.  These responses influence transient climate response (TCR or TCRE), but have less impact on equilibrium climate sensitivity (ECS) because the planet's energy balance ultimately dictates the realignment between long-term GST and the atmospheric  concentration; which is itself mainly a function of total fossil carbon emitted.

Earth's inertial responses are important because they provide the planet's diversity of life and its human civilization further time to adapt to an acceptable degree of planetary change.  However, unadaptable change like that accompanying some tipping points may only be avoidable with early understanding and mitigation of the risk of such dangerous outcomes.  An aim of Integrated assessment modelling, summarized for example as  Shared Socioeconomic Pathways (SSP), is to explore Earth system risks that accompany large inertia and uncertainty in the trajectory of human drivers of change.

Thermal inertia

Ocean inertia
The ocean’s thermal inertia delays some global warming for decades or centuries. It is accounted for in global climate models, and has been confirmed via measurements of Earth’s energy balance.  The observed transient climate sensitivity is proportional to the thermal inertia time scale.

Ice sheet inertia
Even after  emissions are lowered, the melting of ice sheets would continue, and further increase sea-level rise for centuries. The slow transportation of heat into the oceans and the slow response time of ice sheets will continue until the new system equilibrium has been reached.

Permafrost takes longer to respond to a warming planet because of thermal inertia, due to ice rich materials and permafrost thickness.

Inertia from carbon cycle feedbacks

Earth's carbon cycle feedback includes a positive feedback (identified as the climate-carbon feedback) which prolongs warming for centuries, and a negative feedback (identified as the concentration-carbon feedback) which limits the ultimate warming response to fossil carbon emissions.  The near-term effect following emissions is asymmetric with latter mechanism being about four times larger, and results in a net slowing contribution to the observed inertia of the climate system in the decades following emissions.

Ecological  inertia

Depending on the ecosystem, effects of climate change could show quickly, while others take more time to respond. For instance, coral bleaching can occur in a single warm season, while trees may be able to persist for decades under a changing climate, but be unable to regenerate. Changes in the frequency of extreme weather events could disrupt ecosystems as a consequence, depending on individual response times of species.

Policy implications of inertia
The IPCC concluded that the inertia and uncertainty of the climate system, ecosystems, and socioeconomic systems implies that margins for safety should be considered. Thus, setting strategies, targets, and time tables for avoiding dangerous interference through climate change. Further the IPCC concluded in their 2001 report that the stabilization of atmospheric  concentration, temperature, or sea level is affected by:

The inertia of the climate system, which will cause climate change to continue for a period after mitigation actions are implemented. 
Uncertainty regarding the location of possible thresholds of irreversible change and the behavior of the system in their vicinity. 
The time lags between adoption of mitigation goals and their achievement.

References

Climate change
Hydrology
Oceanography
Glaciology